In mathematics, a transformation is a function f, usually with some geometrical underpinning, that maps a set X to itself, i.e. .
Examples include linear transformations of vector spaces and geometric transformations, which include projective transformations, affine transformations, and specific affine transformations, such as rotations, reflections and translations.

Partial transformations 
While it is common to use the term transformation for any function of a set into itself (especially in terms like "transformation semigroup" and similar), there exists an alternative form of terminological convention in which the term "transformation" is reserved only for bijections. When such a narrow notion of transformation is generalized to partial functions, then a partial transformation is a function f: A → B, where both A and B are subsets of some set X.

Algebraic structures
The set of all transformations on a given base set, together with function composition, forms a regular semigroup.

Combinatorics
For a finite set of cardinality n, there are nn transformations and (n+1)n partial transformations.

See also
Coordinate transformation
Data transformation (statistics)
Geometric transformation
Infinitesimal transformation
Linear transformation
Rigid transformation
Transformation geometry
Transformation semigroup
Transformation group
Transformation matrix

References

External links

 
Functions and mappings